Azerbaijan State Marine Academy (ASMA) is a non-profit public university located in Baku, Azerbaijan. The Academy was established in 1996 and is accredited by the Azerbaijan Ministry of Education.

References 

Universities in Baku
Engineering universities and colleges in Azerbaijan
Science and technology in Azerbaijan
Educational institutions established in 1996
1996 establishments in Azerbaijan